Dublin Molecular Medicine Centre (DMMC) was a charity set up in 2002, to create critical mass in molecular medicine research in Dublin, Ireland. Funding was provided by the Higher Education Authority.

Resources
The academic resources supporting the teaching hospitals include:
 UCD Conway Institute of Biomolecular & Biomedical Research which is organised into 3 interactive multi-disciplinary centres : synthesis and chemical biology; integrative biology and molecular medicine.
 RCSI Research Institute whose portfolio included cellular neuroscience, molecular research, advanced drug delivery, proteomics and pharmacy.
 TCD Institute of Molecular Medicine focuses on cancer (prostate, haematological, esophageal, cervical, thoracic), infection and immunity (tuberculosis); genomic research into inflammatory disease, molecular histopathology, cell signalling, neuropsychiatric genetics and nutrigenomics.

New Clinical Research Centre
DMMC secured funding from the Wellcome Trust for a major clinical research centre to be led by Professor Dermot P. Kelleher for Dublin comprising two elements:
 A new research centre at St. James's Hospital, Dublin.
A network of new clinical research facilities linking the proposed new centre to existing centres at Beaumont Hospital, Dublin, St. Vincent’s University Hospital Dublin and Mater Misericordiae University Hospital

Successor
Dublin Molecular Medicine Centre evolved to become Molecular Medicine Ireland which was established in 2008.

References

External links
 DMMC 2005 Annual Report

Medical and health organisations based in the Republic of Ireland
Economy of Dublin (city)
Pharmaceutical industry
2002 establishments in Ireland